Mermessus trilobatus is a species of dwarf spider in the family Linyphiidae. It is found in North America, has been introduced into Azores, and Europe.

References

Linyphiidae
Articles created by Qbugbot
Spiders described in 1882